Seth Adonkor (30 October 1961 – 18 November 1984) was a professional footballer who played as a midfielder. Born in Ghana, he held both French and Ghanaian citizenship.

Personal life 
Adonkor was the half-brother of Marcel Desailly, who went on to play for the France national team.

Honours
Nantes
Division 1: 1982–83
Coupe de France runner-up: 1982–83

References

External links
 Stats

1961 births
1984 deaths
French footballers
Association football defenders
Association football midfielders
FC Nantes players
Ligue 1 players
Road incident deaths in France
Ghanaian emigrants to France
Footballers from Accra
Ga-Adangbe people
French sportspeople of Ghanaian descent
Footballers from Nantes
Ghanaian footballers
Black French sportspeople